Postbar, PostBar, or postbar may refer to:

 Baidu Tieba, also known as Baidu Postbar
 PostBar, a blank-ink barcode system used by Canada Post